The Ideal Scout, also known as The Boy Scout, is the most famous work by Canadian sculptor R. Tait McKenzie (1867–1938). The original statue stood in front of the Cradle of Liberty Council at 22nd and Winter Streets in Philadelphia, Pennsylvania, from 1937 to 2013. Replicas can be found at Boy Scouts of America councils across the United States, as well as at Gilwell Park in London, England, and at Scouts Canada's national office in Ottawa. The Smithsonian American Art Museum's database lists 18 copies.

History

McKenzie sat on the executive board of the Boy Scouts organization in Philadelphia for more than 20 years. Asked to produce a figure of "an ideal scout," the sculptor chose several young scouts to model in uniform. In 1915, he gave the executive board an 18-inch bronze figure, together with rights to the royalties resulting from sales of copies. He said that the boy's uncovered head denoted reverence, obedience to authority, and discipline. The hatchet held by the scout is a symbol of truthfulness and the hope it would never be unsheathed for wanton destruction, but "applied unceasingly to the neck of treachery, treason, cowardice, discourtesy, dishonesty, and dirt."

McKenzie's life-sized version of the work was unveiled at Philadelphia's Cradle of Liberty Council on June 12, 1937.

A replica in Ottawa, Illinois, adorns the grave of William D. Boyce (1858–1929), founder of the Boy Scouts of America, who modeled the organization on Great Britain's Boy Scouts Association.

Cradle of Liberty Council

The Philadelphia headquarters was built by the Boy Scouts of America on city-owned land in 1929, with the council paying a nominal $1-per-year rent. In 2008, the City of Philadelphia filed an anti-discrimination lawsuit in response to the BSA's national policy of excluding openly gay scout leaders, demanding that the Cradle of Liberty Council defy the BSA policy, pay a market-rate rent on the building, or vacate it. The council won the lawsuit in Federal court, and the judge ordered the city to pay its $877,000 in legal fees. Instead, the city settled with the council, paying the bulk of its legal fees but requiring it to vacate the building. The Ideal Scout was removed in 2013.

Partial list of locations

Statuette
Brookings Library Brookings, South Dakota 
Philadelphia Museum of Art (1915) 18-inch statuette - accession number 42-7-1
St. Louis, Missouri
University of Pennsylvania, Philadelphia
University of Tennessee, Knoxville

Statue

Allentown, Pennsylvania (1975)
Ann Arbor, Michigan (1980)
Atlanta, Georgia (Atlanta Area Council Volunteer Service Center)
Baltimore, Maryland, (1937)
Cleveland, Ohio (1962)
Delray Beach, Florida
Denver, Colorado - Hamilton Scout Headquarters
Detroit, Michigan (1965)
East Stroudsburg, Pennsylvania (1972)
Elbert Colorado - McNeil Scout Ranch at Peaceful Valley (1973)
Farmington, Pennsylvania (1991)
Fort Worth, Texas (1956)
Goshen, Virginia - Goshen Scout Reservation
Greenburg, Pennsylvania (1982)
Hudson, Wisconsin - Lakefront Park (2009)
Indianapolis, Indiana (1990)
Irving, Texas (1979)
Jackson, Mississippi (1937)
Kalamazoo (Texas Township), Michigan (2015)
Lakeland, Florida (Publix Corporate Office)
Kansas City, Kansas (1937)
Kenai, Alaska - Eric Hansen Park (1997)
Lancaster, Pennsylvania (1995)
Ligonier, Pennsylvania (1937)
Mansfield, Ohio (Heart of Ohio Council Service Center)
Mechanicsburg, Pennsylvania (1978)
Milwaukee, Wisconsin (1985)
Mobile, Alabama (Mobile Area Council)
Morganville (Marlboro Township), New Jersey
Naperville, Illinois
Ogden, Utah
Ottawa, Illinois (1941) - grave of William D. Boyce, founder of the Boy Scouts of America
Philadelphia, Pennsylvania, Cradle of Liberty Council (1937)
Pittsburgh, Pennsylvania (1937)
Portland, Oregon (1972)
Raleigh, North Carolina
Reedesville, Pennsylvania (1992)
Sharpsburg, Pennsylvania (1937)
Sioux Falls, South Dakota
St. Paul, Minnesota (1965)
University of Pennsylvania (1937)
Vernon Hills, Illinois (2018)
Westlake, Texas, Scouting U, Westlake Campus (Center for Professional Development)

Gallery

See also
List of Scouting memorials

References

External links

The Ideal Scout

Statues in the United States
Culture of Philadelphia
1915 sculptures
Boy Scouts of America
Sculptures of men
Sculpture series
Scouting in art
Removed statues
Scouting monuments and memorials